KK Olimpas is a basketball team based in Plungė, Lithuania. The team currently competes in the third-tier Regional Basketball League (RKL). The club previously competed in the first-tier Lithuanian Basketball League (LKL) and second-tier National Basketball League (NKL).

History 
The team was founded in 1989. In 1993, the club competed in the Lithuanian Basketball League (LKL), falling to BC Lavera in the quarterfinals. The team was led by Augenijus Vaškys, who averaged the highest number of points per game for that season – 22.9. The next season, the team signed two Americans – Patrick Jones and Tim Brooks. The team finished in seventh place in the group stage, upsetting Žalgiris Kaunas and Atletas Kaunas in the last few group stage games to secure a ticket to the LKL playoffs. However, the team again lost in the quarterfinals, this time to the star–studded BC Atletas 2–1.

Patrick Jones, who was second in the league in points per game with 24.4, left the team before the start of the 1995–1996 season. He was replaced by the Canadian sharpshooter Joey Vickery, who continued the Olimpas tradition of nearly leading the LKL in points per game with 21.7. After a successful run in the group stage, the team finally won the quarterfinal match and advanced to the semifinal, where it lost to Žalgiris in two close matches. The team also participated in the FIBA European Cup Second Qualifying Round that season, losing to Dynamo Moscow.

The team opened a new chapter in its history the following season by merging with the LKKA champion BC Mažeikiai and forming BC Žemaitijos Lokiai, or Žemaitijos Olimpas, as the team was known in the LKL. The team lost many of its leaders; Vickery and Brooks left the team, as well as head coach Rimantas Endrijaitis, who successfully coached Olimpas for two seasons. The team, however, acquired new talent: Latvian Olympian Igors Miglinieks, American center Willie B. Kelly, and former Mažeikiai leader Darius Staugaitis. With those players at the helm, the team won the 1997 Korać Cup qualifying round against Dinamo Tbilisi, but finished third in the preliminary round and did not advance further. Coaching changes in the middle of the season brought Valdemaras Chomičius and Jeremiah Walker into the team, with the former serving as a playing coach. Chomičius' team made it to the LKL finals for the first time in its history, where it lost to Žalgiris Kaunas in three games.

Such success in the LKL guaranteed Žemaitijos Lokiai a spot in the FIBA European Cup for the 1997–1998 season. Although the team lost Miglinieks, Kelly, Walker and Staugaitis, it celebrated Brooks' return, who had spent the year playing in France. Brooks and Vaškys led the team in its efforts to advance to the second round of the European Cup; however, they were not enough as the team finished in fifth place in the group stage with 2 wins and 8 losses. The team's performance in the LKL also waned; the team lost to Lietuvos rytas in the quarterfinals.

In 1998, the team's name was changed back to Olimpas Plungė. Financial difficulties forced the team to forego participation in the LKL, and soon afterwards, the team disbanded.

Olimpas was reestablished in 2011 and participated in the third-tier RKL. The very first season, Olimpas finished first in the league and was promoted to the NKL.

Notable players 
  Augenijus Vaškys (1993–1998)
  Mindaugas Pranckevičius (1993–1998)
  Evaldas Jocys (1993–1996; 1997; 2011–2013)
  Darius Staugaitis (1996–1997)
  Valdemaras Chomičius (1996–1998)
  Romanas Brazdauskis (1997–1998)
  Tim Brooks (1994–1996; 1997–1998)
  Patrick Jones (1994–1995)
  Jeremiah Walker (1996–1997)
  Joey Vickery (1995–1996)
  Igors Miglinieks (1996–1997)

Head coaches 
 Genadijus Glikmanas (1990–1994)
 Rimantas Endrijaitis (1994–1996)
 Henrikas Giedraitis (1996)
 Valdemaras Chomičius (1996–1998)
 Genadijus Glikmanas (1998)
 Alidas Žukauskas (2011–present)

References

External links 
 Official website (Lithuanian)
 FIBAEurope.com profile
 EuroBasket.net profile

Basketball teams in Lithuania
Sport in Plungė